Myripristis amaena is a species of fish in the family Holocentridae found in the Pacific Ocean. Their range spans from Indonesia and the Philippines, Hawaii and Ducie Island, north to Ryukyu and Minami-Tori-shima, and south to Micronesia. They are reef fish, often inhabiting caves and rock ledges.

References

External links
 

amaena
Fish described in 1873